Mark IX or Mark 9 often refers to the ninth version of a product, frequently military hardware. "Mark", meaning "model" or "variant", can be abbreviated "Mk."

Mark IX or Mark 9 can specifically refer to:

In technology

In military and weaponry
 BL 9.2 inch gun Mk IX–X (1899), a British 9.2 inch coastal defence cannon
 Armstrong Whitworth 12-inch 40-calibre naval gun Mark IX (1901), a British naval gun that was later used on land in the BL 12 inch Railway Gun
 21in Mk IX torpedo, a British 21-inch torpedo
 Bliss-Leavitt Mark 9 torpedo (1915), an American 21-inch torpedo 
 Mark IX tank, a World War I troop-carrying tank—the first armoured personnel carrier
 Ordnance QF 2 pounder (1936–1945), British mounted gun used in World War II
 Supermarine Spitfire Mk IX, the second most numerous Spitfire variant
 Floro MK-9 (2001), a submachine gun designed and built in the Philippines
 W9 (nuclear warhead),  nuclear artillery shell

Other vehicles
 Jaguar Mark IX (1959–1961), a British luxury car
 Lincoln MK9 (2004), a concept car

Other uses
 Mark 9 or Mark IX, the ninth chapter of the Gospel of Mark in the New Testament of the Christian Bible
 Mark IX Hawk, a fictional spacecraft in the Space 1999 TV series